The New Moscow Constituency (No.202) is a Russian legislative constituency in Moscow. It is covers New Moscow and the city of Troitsk - large territory to the South-West of Moscow added to the region in 2012 from parts of Moscow Oblast. In 2016 the New Moscow constituency was created from parts of Podolsk constituency of Moscow Oblast and former Universitetsky constituency of Western Moscow.

Members elected

Election results

2016

|-
! colspan=2 style="background-color:#E9E9E9;text-align:left;vertical-align:top;" |Candidate
! style="background-color:#E9E9E9;text-align:left;vertical-align:top;" |Party
! style="background-color:#E9E9E9;text-align:right;" |Votes
! style="background-color:#E9E9E9;text-align:right;" |%
|-
|style="background-color:"|
|align=left|Dmitry Sablin
|align=left|United Russia
|86,875
|46.22%
|-
|style="background-color:"|
|align=left|Igor Sagenbayev
|align=left|Communist Party
|19,075
|10.15%
|-
|style="background-color:"|
|align=left|Andrey Rudkovsky
|align=left|Liberal Democratic Party
|15,845
|8.43%
|-
|style="background:;"| 
|align=left|Viktor Sidnev
|align=left|Party of Growth
|15,643
|8.32%
|-
|style="background-color:"|
|align=left|Alina Salnikova
|align=left|Yabloko
|9,876
|5.25%
|-
|style="background:;"| 
|align=left|Dmitry Kravchenko
|align=left|Communists of Russia
|8,888
|4.73%
|-
|style="background:"|
|align=left|Aleksandra Astavina
|align=left|The Greens
|8,640
|4.60%
|-
|style="background: ;"| 
|align=left|Oleg Beznisko
|align=left|People's Freedom Party
|6,082
|3.24%
|-
|style="background:#00A650;"| 
|align=left|Anatoly Chuprina
|align=left|Civilian Power
|3,533
|1.88%
|-
|style="background:"| 
|align=left|Aleksey Zheravlyov
|align=left|Patriots of Russia
|3,083
|1.64%
|-
|style="background:;"| 
|align=left|Olga Kosets
|align=left|Civic Platform
|2,733
|1.45%
|-
| colspan="5" style="background-color:#E9E9E9;"|
|- style="font-weight:bold"
| colspan="3" style="text-align:left;" | Total
| 187,979
| 100%
|-
| colspan="5" style="background-color:#E9E9E9;"|
|- style="font-weight:bold"
| colspan="4" |Source:
|
|}

2021

|-
! colspan=2 style="background-color:#E9E9E9;text-align:left;vertical-align:top;" |Candidate
! style="background-color:#E9E9E9;text-align:left;vertical-align:top;" |Party
! style="background-color:#E9E9E9;text-align:right;" |Votes
! style="background-color:#E9E9E9;text-align:right;" |%
|-
|style="background-color: " |
|align=left|Dmitry Sablin (incumbent)
|align=left|United Russia
|132,835
|40.71%
|-
|style="background-color: "|
|align=left|Danil Makhnitsky
|align=left|New People
|59,781
|18.32%
|-
|style="background-color: " |
|align=left|Igor Sukhanov
|align=left|Communist Party
|34,962
|10.72%
|-
|style="background-color: " |
|align=left|Aleksandr Mikhaylovsky
|align=left|A Just Russia — For Truth
|19,776
|6.06%
|-
|style="background-color: " |
|align=left|Natalia Andrusenko
|align=left|Communists of Russia
|19,089
|5.85%
|-
|style="background-color: " |
|align=left|Aleksey Lapshov
|align=left|Liberal Democratic Party
|16,671
|4.80%
|-
|style="background-color: " |
|align=left|Viktor Sidnev
|align=left|Party of Growth
|10,919
|3.35%
|-
|style="background: ;"| 
|align=left|Yulia Muratova
|align=left|Green Alternative
|9,040
|2.77%
|-
|style="background-color: " |
|align=left|Yevgenia Gershberg
|align=left|Yabloko
|8,450
|2.59%
|-
|style="background-color: "|
|align=left|Sergey Bogatov
|align=left|Russian Party of Freedom and Justice
|6,801
|2.08%
|-
|style="background: ;"| 
|align=left|Aleksey Pridorozhny
|align=left|Civic Platform
|3,194
|0.98%
|-
| colspan="5" style="background-color:#E9E9E9;"|
|- style="font-weight:bold"
| colspan="3" style="text-align:left;" | Total
| 326,267
| 100%
|-
| colspan="5" style="background-color:#E9E9E9;"|
|- style="font-weight:bold"
| colspan="4" |Source:
|
|}

Sources
202. Новомосковский одномандатный избирательный округ

References

Russian legislative constituencies
Politics of Moscow